Chapit-e Sofla (also Romanized as Chāp‘īt-e Soflá; also known as Choqā Peyat-e Soflá, Choghā Peyat-e Soflá, and Chagha Beit Sofla) is a village in Tarhan-e Gharbi Rural District, Tarhan District, Kuhdasht County, Lorestan Province, Iran. At the 2006 census, its population was 1,104, in 221 families.

References 

Towns and villages in Kuhdasht County